The Ricasoli II government of Italy held office from 20 June 1866 until 10 April 1867, a total of 294 days, or 9 months and 21 days. It was also known as the Government of National Reconciliation, because it led Italy during the Third War of Independence.

History
As Prime Minister, Ricasoli refused Napoleon III's offer to cede Venetia to Italy, on condition that Italy should abandon the Prussian alliance, and also refused the Prussian decoration of the Black Eagle because La Marmora, author of the alliance, was not to receive it.

Upon the departure of the French troops from Rome at the end of 1866 he again attempted to conciliate the Vatican with a convention, in virtue of which Italy would have restored to the Church the property of the suppressed religious orders in return for the gradual payment of 24,000,000. In order to mollify the Vatican he conceded the exequatur to forty-five bishops inimical to the Italian régime. The Vatican accepted his proposal, but the Italian Chamber proved refractory, and, though dissolved by Ricasoli, returned more hostile than before. Without waiting for a vote, Ricasoli resigned office and thenceforward practically disappeared from political life.

Government parties
The government was composed by the following parties:

Composition

References

Italian governments
1866 establishments in Italy
1867 disestablishments in Italy